Helbing is a surname. Notable people with the surname include:

Carola Helbing-Erben (born 1952), German artist
Dirk Helbing (born 1965), German scientist
Ferenc Helbing (1870–1958), Hungarian graphic artist and painter
Karl-Heinz Helbing (born 1957), German sport wrestler

German-language surnames